.

The Musashino Kannon Pilgrimage (Japanese: , Musashino Sanjūsan(33) Kan-non Reijō) is a japanese pilgrimage of thirty three Buddhist temples and an extra one, founded 1940. The temples located in Tokyo and Saitama prefectures, and along the Seibu Railway (formerly name is "Musashino" Railway). The sanctuaries are situated nearby urban area of Tokyo, and the Musashino Kannon Pilgrimage Ground Association prepares dedicaded stamp books for this pilgrimage, so it can be said it is a kind of relatively easy pilgrimade.  Each temple has its own go-eika, which is a kind of tanka for pilgrimage. In addition, it is sometimes called "The hundred Kannon Prilgrimage in Musashi Province" together with the Chichibu 34 Kannon Sanctuary and the Sayama Kannon Pilgrimage.

History 
The Musashino Kannon Pilgrimage was founded by Jōe Shibata, who was a japanese local historian, in 1940, and the opening event was held at Sanpō-ji, which is third one in the temples list, on May 1, 1941. But, it had been in decline and dormant for decades after the World War II. It is because the area suffered war damage, so the temples could not ready to accept pilgrims. Thereafter the Musashino Kannon Pilgrimage Ground Association was reorganized on April 2, 1993, and the official website has also opened. In 2000, all the temples did kaichō, which is public exhibition of religious objects, to commemorate the 60th anniversary of the founding. It is the first time of kaicho from re-founding. After that, the anniversary events have been held every 5 years.

Location 
The sanctuaries are located along the Seibu Railway from the urban area of Tokyo to the mountainous area. ( Most of them are along Ikebukuro Line, its branch lines and Chichibu line, and others are along Shinjuku line and its branch lines. ) So, them in the first half are often in residential areas, but some of them in the last half are in mountain forests. For this reason, traveling for pilgrimage becomes gradually difficult, but it's hiking level, not climbing.

Temples 
The following list contains all the temples of the Musashino Kannon Pilgrimage.

See also 
 The hundred Kannon Prilgrimage in Musashi Province, pilgrimage composed of the Chichibu, Musashino and Sayama pilgrimages. 
 Chichibu 34 Kannon Sanctuary, pilgrimage in Saitama Prefecture.
 Sayama Kannon Pilgrimage, pilgrimage in Tokyo and Saitama prefectures.
 Japan 100 Kannon, pilgrimage composed of the Saigoku, Bandō and Chichibu pilgrimages.
 Saigoku 33 Kannon, pilgrimage in the Kansai region. 
 Bandō 33 Kannon, pilgrimage in the Kantō region.
 Chichibu 34 Kannon, pilgrimage in Saitama Prefecture.
 Shikoku Pilgrimage, 88 Temple pilgrimage in the Shikoku island. 
 Chūgoku 33 Kannon Pilgrimage, pilgrimage in the Chūgoku region.
 Kannon
 Buddhism in Japan
 Tourism in Japan
 For an explanation of terms concerning Japanese Buddhism, Japanese Buddhist art, and Japanese Buddhist temple architecture, see the Glossary of Japanese Buddhism.

Notes

References

Further reading

External links 

 武蔵野三十三観音霊場 The Musashino Kannon Pilgrimage Official Website (in Japanese)

Buddhist pilgrimages 
Japanese pilgrimages
Religious buildings and structures in Tokyo
Religious buildings and structures in Saitama Prefecture
Buddhist temples in Tokyo
Buddhist temples in Saitama Prefecture